Agrotis coquimbensis is a moth of the family Noctuidae. It is found in the Coquimbo Region of Chile.

The wingspan is about 34 mm.

External links
 Noctuinae of Chile

Agrotis
Moths of South America
Moths described in 1903
Endemic fauna of Chile